Arcesis threnodes is a moth of the family Tortricidae first described by Edward Meyrick in 1905. It is found in India, Sri Lanka and Taiwan.

Larval host plants are Amherstia nobilis and Michelia champaca.

Gallery

References

Olethreutini
Moths of Asia
Moths described in 1905
Taxa named by Edward Meyrick